Michael Scott Rawlings (born August 25, 1954) is an American businessman and politician who served as the 59th Mayor of Dallas, Texas. A member of the Democratic Party, he won the nonpartisan 2011 Dallas mayoral election defeating former Dallas Police Chief David Kunkle. He was reelected in 2015 by defeating Dallas lawyer Marcos Ronquillo. 

Rawlings served as CEO of Pizza Hut from 1997 to 2002 and was also a former chief executive of the Tracy-Locke ad agency. In addition to his work in the city, Rawlings is also a prominent opponent of domestic violence, speaking at many events, including a Ring The Bell event at the United Nations alongside actor Patrick Stewart.

Rawlings garnered national attention during the Ebola outbreak, the July 7th, 2016, ambush on Dallas police officers, and a dispute over the Dallas Police and Fire Pension System. On the question of Confederate Statue Removal, Rawlings stated in August 2017 that Confederate statues in Dallas city parks are "monuments of propaganda" and called for a task force to decide what should be done with them. Rawlings pushed for the removal of a Robert E. Lee statue in a city park.

At the 2018 Conference of Mayors, Rawlings, who was known as a supporter of the arts in Dallas, received the 2018 National Award for Local Arts from the United States Conference of Mayors and Americans for the Arts in Washington, DC.

Electoral history

2011 Dallas mayoral election

Initial Election

Runoff Election

2015 Dallas mayoral election

References

External links

 Appearances on C-SPAN programs

1954 births
21st-century American politicians
American chief executives of food industry companies
American Presbyterians
Boston College alumni
Living people
Mayors of Dallas
People from Borger, Texas
Pizza Hut
Texas Democrats
Liverpool High School alumni